Sufetula sufetuloides is a moth in the family Crambidae. It was described by George Hampson in 1919. It is found in Nigeria and Sierra Leone.

References

Moths described in 1919
Spilomelinae
Moths of Africa